No. 668 Squadron RAF was a glider squadron of the Royal Air Force active during the Second World War.

History
No. 668 Squadron RAF was formed on 16 November 1944 at Calcutta, (then) British India as a glider squadron, with the intention of being used for airborne operations by South East Asia Command. It continued to train, as part of No. 343 Wing RAF, until the surrender of Japan, when it became surplus to requirements. The squadron was disbanded on 10 November 1945 at Fatehjang.

Present
The squadron today is represented by 668 Squadron of 2 (Training) Regiment, Army Air Corps.

Aircraft operated

Squadron bases

References

Notes

Bibliography

External links
 History of No.'s 651–670 Squadrons at RAF Web

Aircraft squadrons of the Royal Air Force in World War II
668 Squadron